is a constituency of the House of Representatives in the Diet of Japan (national legislature). It is located in Kanagawa Prefecture, and consists of the cities of Miura and Yokosuka. Former Prime Minister of Japan Junichiro Koizumi served as the first representative of the constituency from its creation in 1996. Koizumi retired at the 2009 elections and his son Shinjirō ran as a candidate for his father's old seat. The Democratic Party of Japan fielded Katsuhito Yokokume, a lawyer and former participant in the Ainori TV show, as a candidate in 2009 to a bid to end the LDP dominance of the district.

As of September 2012, 391,020 eligible voters were registered in the district.

List of representatives

Election results

References 

I

Districts of the House of Representatives (Japan)
Yokosuka, Kanagawa